Jakarta-Cikampek II South Toll Road is an under-construction toll road which connects Jakarta Outer Ring Road at Jatiasih and Purbaleunyi Toll Road at Sadang in Java, Indonesia. The goal of constructing this toll road is to reduce frequent congestion in Jakarta-Cikampek Toll Road, which will also serve as an alternative route from Jakarta to Bandung and vice versa. The toll road is a complementary road for Trans-Java Toll Road, and is expected to be operational by 2024.

Sections
The toll road has three sections,
 Section 1: Jati Asih - Setu, 
 Section 2: Setu - Taman Mekar,  
 Section 3: Taman Mekar - Sadang,

See also

Trans-Java toll road

References

Buildings and structures in Jakarta
Toll roads in Indonesia
Transport in Jakarta
Transport in West Java